The Magic Touch (Chinese: 神算) is a 1992 Hong Kong comedy film written, produced and directed by Michael Hui, and stars Hui himself alongside Leon Lai.

Plot
Hui Wai-kuk (Michael Hui) tells people's fortunes by feeling their bones. In reality, he is a scam who is able to read minds of others because he has gathered information about them in advance; he is able to make a lot of money. The wife of Commissioner David Ho (Philip Chan) of the Inland Revenue Department (IRD) is suspicious that her husband is cheating on her. Hui tells Mrs. Ho the name of the mistress. She then scolds Ho in his office.

Ho sends junior assessor Yau Ho-kei (Leon Lai) to investigate Hui's income. Yau does not work seriously, but he wants to stand out. During the investigation, Hui sustains a brain injury causing his coma. After he wakes up, he discovers that he has gained super abilities, being able to feel people's bones and see their future.

At this time, the IRD is investigating businessman Hung Sam (Sunny Fang) for tax evasion, but the case is progressing slowly. Yau arranges for Hui to get close to Hui for a chance "touch" to find out where Hung's accounting book is hidden.

At first, Hung thought Hui and Yau were gay and avoided them at all costs. But after discovering that Hui is a fortune teller, he hires the two, greatly trusts them, and reveals to them about his drug business. Yau then reports information about Hung's drug business to Commissioner Ho. The case is cracked, Yau is then promoted to investigation superintendent and Hui, having assisted in the case, does not have to pay the tax that he owed for many years.

Cast
Michael Hui as Hui Wai-kuk
Leon Lai as Yau Ho-kei
Ricky Hui as Fat
Winnie Lau as Yeuk-lan
Sunny Fang as Hung Sam
Chan Hiu-ying as May
Dayo Wong as William
Michael Dinga as Senior Tax Inspector Lam
Philip Chan as David Ho
Carrie Ng as Inspector Fong Fong-fong
Yonfan as Man in red at race course VIP
Jamie Luk as One of Hung's thugs
Wan Fat as One of Hung's thugs
Wong Kwong-fai as One of Hung's thugs
Lau Siu-cheung as Large Nurse
Wong Man-shing as Rapist
Lui Tat as Hospital patient
Tin Kai-man as Hospital patient
Teddy Chan as Bartender
Eddie Chan as Mr. Cheung
Zevia Tong as Mrs. Cheung
Chan Choi-lin as Mrs. David Ho
David Lai
Sing Yan as Shapi Dog
Hui Fan as Kei's mom
Chan Wing-chiu as Tax inspector
Cheng Chong as Rape victim
Wong Man-kit
Jacky Cheung
Lee Tung-yue
Yu Ngai-ho as Balding gangster
Lam Ying-kit
Cheung Kam-chuen
Leung Kei-hei as Bettor at race VIP lounge
Jameson Lam as Bettor at race VIP lounge
Hui Si-man as Bettor at race VIP lounge
Jim James as Bar customer
Ho Chi-moon as Bar customer
Hau Woon-ling as Sixth Grammy
John Cheung as John
Peter So as DJ
Ernest Mauser as Priest at clinic
Fei Pak as Policeman

Theme song
Two Hearts Know (兩心知)
Composer: R. Aska
Lyricist: Jolan Heung
Singer: Leon Lai

Reception

Critical
Andrew Saroch of Far East Films rated the film 4 out of 5 stars and wrote "The Magic Touch features a constantly watchable narrative and a number of hilarious scenes; foremost among these is Hui's attempts to feel the villain's knuckles in a number of different and highly amusing situations."

Box office
The film grossed HK$36,399,307 at the Hong Kong box office during its theatrical frun from 24 January to 19 February 1992 in Hong Kong. It remains as Michael Hui's highest-grossing film in his career.

References

External links

The Magic Touch at Hong Kong Cinemagic

1992 films
1992 comedy films
Hong Kong slapstick comedy films
1990s Cantonese-language films
Films directed by Michael Hui
Films set in Hong Kong
Films shot in Hong Kong
1990s Hong Kong films